Jalanta (Aymara jalaña to fly, running of water; west, -nta a suffix, jalanta, inti jalanta west,  also spelled Alanta) is a mountain in the Wansu mountain range in the Andes of Peru, reaching about  above sea level. It is situated in the Cusco Region, Chumbivilcas Province, Santo Tomás District. Jalanta lies north of Wamanripa and east of Waña.

References 

Mountains of Cusco Region